Jin Zhuanglong (born March 1964) is a Chinese business executive and politician, currently serving as Minister of Industry and Information Technology since July 2022.

He was an alternate member of the 17th and 18th Central Committee of the Chinese Communist Party, and a member of the 19th Central Committee of the Chinese Communist Party. He was a representative of the 19th National Congress of the Chinese Communist Party and is a representative of the 20th National Congress of the Chinese Communist Party.

Biography
He attended the Zhejiang Zhoushan High School. He graduated from Beihang University majoring in winged missile design in 1986 before gaining a master's degree in engineering from Shanghai Academy of Spaceflight Technology in 1989. He went on to receive his doctor's degree in economics from Fudan University in 2003. He also studied at the Central Party School of the Chinese Communist Party.

Jin joined the Chinese Communist Party (CCP) in May 1984. Starting in June 1989, he successively served as a technician, engineering team leader, deputy director of the research office, assistant engineer, engineer, senior engineer, and researcher at the Eighth Design Department of Shanghai Aerospace Bureau. He moved up the ranks to become deputy director in May 1993 and director in February 1996. He rose to become director of Shanghai Aerospace Bureau (now Shanghai Academy of Spaceflight Technology) in January 1998.

In June 1999, he was assigned to the China Aerospace Science and Technology Corporation, becoming deputy general manager in December 2001.

In June 2004, he was appointed secretary-general of the Commission for Science, Technology and Industry for National Defense, in addition to serving as deputy director of the China National Space Administration. In July 2005, he was made deputy director of the Commission for Science, Technology and Industry for National Defense, concurrently serving as deputy leader of the Preparatory Team for the Large Passenger Aircraft Project.

In March 2008, he was chosen as general manager, vice chairman and deputy party secretary of the Commercial Aircraft Corporation of China, Ltd., rising to chairman and party secretary in January 2012.

On 29 July 2022, he was appointed party secretary of the Ministry of Industry and Information Technology, replacing Xiao Yaqing, who was put under investigation for suspected "violation of discipline and law" by the Central Commission for Discipline Inspection (CCDI), the party's internal disciplinary body, and the National Supervisory Commission, the highest anti-corruption agency of China.

References

1964 births
Living people
People from Zhoushan
Beihang University alumni
Fudan University alumni
Central Party School of the Chinese Communist Party alumni
People's Republic of China politicians from Zhejiang
Chinese Communist Party politicians from Zhejiang
Alternate members of the 17th Central Committee of the Chinese Communist Party
Alternate members of the 18th Central Committee of the Chinese Communist Party
Members of the 19th Central Committee of the Chinese Communist Party
Members of the 20th Central Committee of the Chinese Communist Party